
The Avia BH-20 was a civil trainer aircraft built in Czechoslovakia in 1924. It was a single-bay, unstaggered biplane of conventional configuration. The wings were braced with N-struts at around half-span. The pilot and instructor were seated in tandem, open cockpits.

Specifications

References

 
 Němeček, V. (1968). Československá letadla. Praha: Naše Vojsko.

1920s Czechoslovakian civil trainer aircraft
BH-20
Biplanes
Single-engined tractor aircraft